The Seinäjoki University of Applied Sciences (SeAMK; in ) is a multidisciplinary non-profit government dependent higher education institution and an efficient actor in education and research, development and innovation (RDI) in the region of South Ostrobothnia in West Finland.

The Seinäjoki University of Applied Sciences specialises in entrepreneurship, food and internationality. The aim of the Seinäjoki University of Applied Sciences is to increase competence, competitiveness and well-being in the area of its operations. SeAMK Campus is located in the Technology Park Frami in Seinäjoki.

Seinäjoki University of Applied Sciences currently has about 5,000 students, of which 10% are international degree students. SeAMK has approximately 400 employees, of which over 100 work in the field of research, development and innovations (RDI).  Jaakko Hallila, D. Sc. (Admin.), is the President and CEO of the University of Applied Sciences. He has been the President of SeAMK since September 2020, when Tapio Varmola, who was the President since the establishment of SeAMK, retired. SeAMK was established in 1992. Seinäjoen Ammattikorkeakoulu Oy (limited company) has been the administrator of SeAMK since 2014.

Seinäjoki University of Applied Sciences has two faculties and six fields of education. The faculties are SeAMK Technology and Business, and SeAMK Welfare and Culture. All the education fields of the faculties provide higher education and are efficient actors in research, development and innovation area.  

In 2020, 2021 and 2022, Seinäjoki University of Applied Sciences (SeAMK) has been chosen as the best university of applied sciences in Finland in the results of the nationwide graduation feedback survey (AVOP). According to the graduates of a bachelor’s degree, SeAMK has the best study satisfaction, the best contents of studies, the best learning environments as well as the best study support services and working life connections. In the areas of internationality, work life counselling, internship, and thesis, SeAMK reached the second highest place. In this nationwide survey, students evaluate and provide feedback on completed studies.

The Finnish higher education system is divided into traditional research universities, which focus more on academic research, and universities of applied sciences, which emphasise more working life connections. SeAMK is a university of applied sciences. See Finnish educational system.

Faculties and Fields of Education
SeAMK's faculties are:
SeAMK Technology and Business
SeAMK Welfare and Culture
SeAMK's fields of education are:

 Business
 Culture
 Food and Hospitality
 Health Care and Social Work
 Natural Resources
 Technology

Education
Seinäjoki University of Applied Sciences provides education aiming at high-level professional qualification in the following fields:
Culture
Social sciences, Business and Administration
Technology, Communication and Transport
Natural Resources and the Environment
Social services, Health and Sports
Tourism, Catering and Domestic Services

Seinäjoki University of Applied Sciences has 21 Bachelor and 13 Master degree programmes  of which five degree programmes are totally taught in English:
Bachelor degree programmes in International Business (BBA), Automation Engineering (BEng), Agri-Food Engineering (AFE) as well as Nursing (RN), and Master degree programme in International Business Management (MBA).

Also double degree programmes are available in the fields of technology and business.

References

External links
Seinäjoki University of Applied Sciences 
SAMO – Student Union of Seinäjoki University of Applied Sciences 

University of Applied Sciences
Universities and colleges in Finland
Education in South Ostrobothnia
Educational institutions established in 1992
1992 establishments in Finland